Sardar Shakhawat Hossain Bokul is a Bangladesh Nationalist Party politician and the former Member of Parliament of Narsingdi-4.

Career
Bokul was elected to parliament from Narsingdi-4 as a Bangladesh Nationalist Party candidate in 1991 and 2001.

On 4 June 2017, he was sued by a businessman for extortion. On 26 December 2013, he was arrested from the residence of Khaleda Zia, former Prime Minister and Chairperson of Bangladesh Nationalist Party. He was admitted to Dhaka Medical College Hospital following his arrest.

References

Living people
People from Narsingdi District
Bangladesh Nationalist Party politicians
5th Jatiya Sangsad members
6th Jatiya Sangsad members
8th Jatiya Sangsad members
Year of birth missing (living people)